To promote relationships and cooperation among the Chinese business community within the state, and to safeguard, uphold and fight for their economic rights, miners, Mr. Foo Choo Choon and Yau Tuck Seng led a group of businessmen to form the Perak Chinese Chamber of Commerce in 1907.

Perak Chinese Chamber of Commerce and Industry ( PCCCI ), formerly known as Perak Chinese Chamber of Commerce, was founded in 1907 as a society under the law.

The chamber currently has 1276 trade society members, and more than 10,000 individual, corporate and trade society members.

The Chamber also hosted the Annual General Meeting of The Associated Chinese Chambers of Commerce and Industry of Malaysia in Years 1970, 1979, 1995 and 2003 respectively.

Perak Chinese' Representative To China's Parliament
In 1912, the strong support of the Chinese of Perak for China's 1912 Xinhai Revolution entitled them to be represented at the National Assembly in Peking. After Foo Choo Choon, who was unanimously voted to that position, turned down the honour, elections were held at the Perak Chinese Chambers, the voters being made up of those who had contributed significantly to the Chinese Patriotic Fund. Chinese Journal Chung Sin Pau's former editor, Tien Toon resident in China who was well connected in Ipoh was eventually chosen when all local nominees, over 1,000 tin miners and businessmen, realised that no one wanted to take time off to attend meetings at Peking.

China's Financial Crisis of 1912
Foo Choo Choon as head of the Perak Chinese Chamber of Commerce, representing the Perak Chinese community, initiated a fund raising drive to help address the financial crisis in China at that time.

References

Sources

Notes
The History of South-East, South, and East Asia: Essays and Documents By Kay Kim Khoo, Contributor Kay Kim Khoo, Published by Oxford University Press, 1977 pp. 195, 196
Beyond the Tin Mines: Coolies, Squatters, and New Villagers in the Kinta Valley, Malaysia, C. 1880-1980 By Francis Kok-Wah Loh, Published by Oxford University Press, 1988,  p. 212
Joint Declaration by the Chinese Guilds and Associations of Malaysia 1985 By Xuelan'e Zhonghua da hui tang, Xuelan'e Zhonghua da hui tang Published by Selangor Chinese Assembly Hall, 1985 p. 22
Malayan Chinese and China: Conversion in Identity Consciousness, 1945-1957 By Fujio Hara Published by NUS Press, 2003 , ; p. 62
Economic Bulletin - Singapore International Chamber of Commerce By Singapore International Chamber of Commerce Published by Singapore International Chamber of Commerce, 1969; Item notes: 1969 Jul-Dec; p. 32
Colonial Labor Policy and Administration: A History of Labor in the Rubber Plantation Industry in Malaya, C. 1910-1941 By J. Norman Parmer Published for the Association for Asian Studies by J.J. Augustin, 1960; pp. 163, 240, 293
China Yearbook, by China Hsüan ch'uan pu, China Xing zheng yuan. Xin wen ju, Hsüan ch'uan pu, China, Published by China Pub. Co., 1937 p. 579
Tan Cheng Lock Papers: A Descriptive List By Institute of Southeast Asian Studies, Institute of Southeast Asian Studies Library, Institute of Southeast Asian Studies Published by The Institute, 1972; p. vii
Tun Tan: Portrait of a Statesman By John Victor Morais Published by Quins, 1981; p. 2
South East Asia Colonl Hist V4: Colonial History By Paul H. Kratoska Published by Taylor & Francis, 2004; ; p. 375
Journal of the Malayan Branch of the Royal Asiatic Society - Vol. 3, pt. 2 comprises a monograph entitled: British Malaya, 1864–1867, by L.A. Mills, with appendix by C. O. Blagden, 1925. Issued also separately. - By Malaysian Branch, Royal Asiatic Society of Great Britain and Ireland Malaysian Branch, Singapore Published by, 1992; p. 89
Taiwan Trade Monthly of the Republic of China Published by Epoch Publicity Agency, 1965; p. 39
Special Agents Series (no.218), 1907, By United States Bureau of Manufactures, United States, Bureau of Manufactures, United States Bureau of Foreign and Domestic Commerce. (Dept. of commerce), Bureau of Foreign and Domestic Commerce Published by G.P.O., 1907

External links
Perak Chamber of Commerce and Industry

Perak
Chambers of commerce